Smith & Williamson  was a United Kingdom financial and professional services firm. It was acquired by wealth manager, Tilney, in 2019 and the enlarged firm was rebranded as Evelyn Partners in 2022.

History
Smith & Williamson was founded by David Johnstone Smith and Andrew Williamson in Glasgow in 1881. The first London office was opened in 1893. Smith & Williamson has had a number of mergers. The first merger was with NCL (Securities) Limited, an investment manager, in 2002. Its second merger was with Solomon Hare, a private accounting firm in UK, in 2005. In 2018 Smith & Williamson merged with LHM Casey McGrath in Dublin. In September 2020, the company announced it had completed its merger with the Tilney group. As of then, no changes to existing operations had been announced.

In February 2022 the merged company Tilney Smith & Williamson, owned by private equity funds Permira and Warburg Pincus, was re-branded as Evelyn Partners.

In May 2022, the company announced the acquisition of two Scotland based financial adviser and asset management companies, Capital Risk Management and MP2 financial. The acquisition was processed with the aim of expanding the organisation’s reach in the UK.

Locations
Smith & Williamson had twelve offices in the United Kingdom and Ireland: Bristol, Birmingham, Cheltenham, Guildford, Salisbury and Southampton, England; Belfast and Dublin (City and Sandyford), Ireland; Jersey; and Glasgow, Scotland, with the headquarter office in London, England. In Belfast the firm operated under the name Cunningham Coates.

Panama Papers
The company's activities came under scrutiny in 2016, when it was revealed that its employees had managed the Smith & Williamson Blairmore Global Equity Fund since 1997. This fund was founded by David Cameron's (prime minister of the UK from 2010 to 2016) late father Ian. Earlier in the year, HM Revenue & Customs won a court case against Smith & Williamson, over the treatment of "goodwill payments" made by the firm to a portfolio manager and some team members.

References

External links
 Smith & Williamson

Financial services companies established in 1881
Accounting firms of the United Kingdom
1881 establishments in the United Kingdom